Community Unit School District 303 is a comprehensive K-12 public education system covering  in the Fox Valley,  west of Chicago.

District 303 serves about 13,590 students from the City of St. Charles and portions of West Chicago, South Elgin, Wayne, Campton Hills, a very small portion of Elgin and unincorporated Kane County.

History
When formal school districts were originally created in the late 19th century and early 20th century, they were usually drawn along township boundaries. However, legislation was passed in 1946-47 that encouraged school districts to consolidate. Community Unit School District 303 was born in 1949 when, through a referendum, voters approved consolidating High School District 150, Elementary District 87 and Little Woods District 79.

People served by the Wasco two-year high school program voted in 1950 to consolidate with District 303 after another change in state law eliminated two-year high schools.

Schools
The district operates 11 elementary schools, two middle schools, and two high schools, serving about 13,590 students. Athletes from both high schools belong to the DuKane Conference

Elementary (K-5)
Anderson Elementary School
Bell-Graham Elementary School
Corron Elementary School
Davis Primary School
Richmond Intermediate School
Ferson Creek Elementary School
Fox Ridge Early Childhood Center- (Was Fox Ridge Elementary but was shut down in 2018 and repurposed for early childhood education)
Lincoln Elementary School
Munhall Elementary School
Norton Creek Elementary School
Wasco Elementary School
Wild Rose Elementary School
 In 2005, District 303 purchased  at the corner of Crane and Silver Glen roads with the intention of building an additional elementary and middle school (in a single joined facility) at that location.  Referendums in 2005 and 2006 intended to finance the construction of the schools failed to pass.
Middle Schools (6-8)
Thompson Middle School - Thunder
Wredling Middle School - Redhawks
High Schools (9-12)
St. Charles East High School - Saints
St. Charles North High School - North Stars

Davis-Richmond merger
In 2010, the school district decided to combine Davis, an overcrowded elementary school, and Richmond, a failing school that was only at 50% capacity, to create Davis Primary (grades K-2) and Richmond Intermediate (grades 3-5). The schools are close together so transportation was easy. The school days at Richmond were made 40 minutes longer.  Spanish and French language courses were offered and every student was given their own tablet.

Students
District 303's composite ACT score for 2005 was 21.8 compared to a state average of 20.1.
81.7 percent of all District 303 students met or exceeded state learning standards in 2005 (85.8 percent ISAT; 70.4 percent Prairie State Achievement Exam.) Statewide, an average of 64.9 percent of all students met or exceeded state learning standards in 2005 (68.9 percent ISAT; 54.9 percent PSAE.)

Curriculum
District 303 staff is actively involved in curriculum renewal and redesign in partnership with the Illinois Mathematics and Science Academy along with Brown University.

Parent organizations
District 303 parent organizations include school-level and district Parent Teacher Organizations.

Finances
District 303 operates on a $118.3 million annual operating budget (FY '06)  Total operating revenues are about $120 million. Total expenses including construction and bonded debt are $137 million, versus total revenues (all funds) of $134 million.

Staff
District 303 employs about 1,750 full and part-time staffers in 2005-06, including about 1,065 certificated staff. That number includes about 1,000 teachers.

Staff are represented by four professional associations: the St. Charles Education Association (representing certificated staff); the St. Charles Transportation and Maintenance Association; the St. Charles Educational Support Professionals Association; and the Therapy Association of St. Charles.

Teacher profile
The average teacher salary in 2005 was $52,502. The average teacher had 10.9 years of experience in 2004-2005. About 57 percent of District 303 teachers hold master's degrees or higher.

Growth
District 303 grew significantly since the start of the 21st century. About 250 new students enrolled in District 303 for the 2005-06 school year. Growth of 300-500 new students was expected to continue for the next three to five years.

References

External links

 

School districts in Kane County, Illinois
St. Charles, Illinois